Dow Chemical Co. v. United States, 476 U.S. 227 (1986), was a United States Supreme Court case decided in 1986 dealing with the right to privacy and advanced technology of aerial surveillance.

Factual background and decision
The EPA used, without a warrant, a commercial aerial photographer to get photographs of a heavily guarded Dow facility that was, according to the petitioner, protected by the State Trade Secrecy Law. 
The decision: 
For purposes of aerial surveillance, the open areas of an industrial complex are more comparable to an "open field" in which an individual may not legitimately demand privacy. In the absence of a "reasonable expectation of privacy" the Fourth Amendment prohibiting unreasonable searches does not apply.

See also 
 California v. Ciraolo, 
 California v. Greenwood, 
 Curtilage
 Expectation of privacy
 Florida v. Riley, 
 Kyllo v. United States, 
 Open-fields doctrine

References

Further reading
Diane Rosenwasser Skalak, Dow Chemical Co. v. United States: Aerial Surveillance and the Fourth Amendment, 3 Pace Envtl. L. Rev. 277 (1986) Available at: http://digitalcommons.pace.edu/pelr/vol3/iss2/6
"AERIAL SEARCHES OF FENCED AREAS UPHELD BY COURT," The New York Times (May 20, 1986)

External links

United States Supreme Court cases
1986 in United States case law
United States Supreme Court cases of the Burger Court
Right to privacy under the United States Constitution
United States Fourth Amendment case law
Dow Chemical Company